Radford is a hamlet on the River Glyme in Enstone civil parish about  east of Chipping Norton, Oxfordshire.

History
In 1086, the manor of Radford, in the hundred of Shipton, Oxfordshire, was one of six manors held by Anchetil de Greye from William FitzOsbern, 1st Earl of Hereford. The Domesday Book entry records Ide(m) Anschtall(us) de Grai ten(et) III hid(ae) in Radeford... ("the same Anchetil de Greye holds three hides in Radford...". 

Radford has a Roman Catholic chapel dedicated to the Holy Trinity, designed by A. W. N. Pugin in a Gothic Revival version of the Early English Gothic style of architecture, built in 1841.

References

Hamlets in Oxfordshire
West Oxfordshire District